Marewad is a village in Dharwad district of Karnataka, India.

Demographics 
As of the 2011 Census of India there were 635 households in Marewad and a total population of 3,194 consisting of 1,603 males and 1,591 females. There were 388 children ages 0-6.

References

Villages in Dharwad district